is a Japanese politician of the Liberal Democratic Party, a member of the House of Representatives in the Diet (national legislature). A native of Hino, Tokyo and graduate of Nihon University, he was elected to the city assembly of Hino  for the first time in 1990 where he served for four terms and then to the House of Representatives for the first time in 2005.

References

External links 
 Official website in Japanese.

1946 births
Living people
People from Hino, Tokyo
Nihon University alumni
Koizumi Children
Japanese municipal councilors
Politicians from Tokyo
Members of the House of Representatives (Japan)
Liberal Democratic Party (Japan) politicians